Reale Società Ginnastica di Torino is a sports club from Turin, founded on 17 March 1844. It is the oldest of its kind in Italy, it is most famous for competing in the Italian Football Championship with its football section which opened in 1897.

Football section
The famous Torinese sports club opened its football section in 1897 to compete in the Concorsi Federali di Calcio, a footballing competition organised by FNGI, this competition was in existence before the Italian Football Championship. They were victorious in their first ever competition.

1898 was an eventful year for the club, they competed in the first ever Italian Football Championship, it was played on 8 May 1898 at Velodromo Umberto I in Turin; Ginnastica Torino lost their semi-final match 2–1 to Genoa. However they also entered the Concorsi Federali di Calcio competition that year and won it for the second time by beating a team from Ferrara, Emilia-Romagna.

The following season, the club adopted Campo Piazza d’Armi as their homeground, it was located near Parco Cavalieri di Vittorio Veneto which is in the Santa Rita neighbourhood of Turin. After beating FBC Torinese 2–0 in the elimination match, Ginnastica lost out 2–0 to Internazionale Torino seven days later. After three more unsuccessful seasons in which they went out during the first match (including a 5–0 defeat to Juventus in 1901) the football section of the club stopped competing in 1902.

Honours
Concorsi Federali di Calcio
Winners: 1897, 1898

Other sports
Various other sporting activities have been practiced by the club, including; judo, artistic gymnastics, basketball and rugby union. In the latter, Ginnastica Torino won the Italian national league in 1947.

References

External links
Official website

Defunct football clubs in Italy
Football clubs in Turin
Sports clubs established in 1844
1844 establishments in Italy
Association football clubs established in 1897
Association football clubs disestablished in 1902
Italian football First Division clubs